Minerva Cycling Team was a Belgian UCI Continental team founded in 2022.

Team roster

References

External links

UCI Continental Teams (Europe)
Cycling teams based in Belgium
Cycling teams established in 2022